87 Squadron or 87th Squadron may refer to:

 No. 87 Squadron RAF
 No. 87 Squadron RAAF
 87th Squadron (Iraq)
 VFA-87 (Strike Fighter Squadron 87), United States Navy
 87th Troop Carrier Squadron, United States Army Air Forces
 87th Fighter-Bomber Squadron, United States Air Force

See also
 87th Division (disambiguation)
 87th Regiment (disambiguation)